Banca Comercială Română (BCR) is a Romanian universal bank.  It is one of the main banks in Romania and is a subsidiary of Erste Group. 

It provides retail, corporate & investment banking, treasury and capital markets services as well as operating specialized companies on the leasing market, assets management, private pensions, mortgages and banking services through internet and mobile phone. , it was the largest bank in Romania with assets of over EUR 16 billion, the largest number of clients.

BCR offers a range of products and financial services through a network of 48 business canters for companies and 643 retail branches located in major cities across the country with over 10,000 employees.

History

1990 – Banca Comercială Română is established by taking over the commercial operations of the National Bank of Romania
1998 – BCR opens a subsidiary in Chisinau, the Republic of Moldova
1999 – BCR absorbs Bancorex
2001 – BCR Leasing is launched on the Romanian market
2003 – BCR privatization by selling the block of shares to EBRD and IFC
2005 – BCR Asigurari de Viata is established
2006 – Austrian bank Erste Bank finalizes the acquisition of Banca Comercială Română. Erste Bank bought 61.8825%* of the BCR shares from the Romanian Government, EBRD and IFC, paying EUR 3.75 billion.
2007 – BCR Administrare Fond de Pensii enters the Romanian market
2008 – Banca Comercială Română sells its insurance operations to Vienna Insurance Group
2008 – BCR Banca pentru Locuinte enters the Romanian market
2009 – BCR adopts a Medium Term Notes (MTN) issuing program – with a total value of EUR 3 billion.

Over time, BCR has brought several innovations on the Romanian banking market, such as:

1994 - BCR becomes the first acquirer in Romania and main member of EUROPAY
1995 - BCR issues the first debit cards in Romania under an international logo.
o	first transaction at an ATM in Romania
2000 - BCR launches the first treasury loan for individuals
o	BCR is the first bank in Romania to trade securities on the secondary market
2002 - BCR launches the first mortgage loan on the Romanian banking market
2003 - BCR is the first Romanian bank to provide mortgage loans to retail and corporate clients
2004 - BCR is the first bank in Romania to install Currency Exchange Machines (CEM)
2005 - BCR enables the use of CHIP cards (smart-card) in its ATM and POS network
2006 – Banca Comercială Română launches for the first time, through the BCR University, the internship program – STUDENT BCR – allowing students to take internships in seven BCR branches in Bucharest
o	BCR is the first banking institution in Romania to launch a national network of specialized offices – “EU Office BCR” – dedicated exclusively to European funds

BCR Group
BCR is part of the BCR Group that also includes BCR Banca pentru Locuințe, BCR Pensii, Societate de Administrare a Fondurilor de Pensii Private S.A., BCR Leasing and good.bee Service RO

BCR Banca pentru Locuințe (BCR BpL) is the BCR Group subsidiary specializing in saving and lending for housing purposes under a collective system, launched in July 2008. In 2009, it signed 134,000 contracts, worth RON 3.5 billion.

BCR BpL is the undisputed market leader in terms of total stock (over 50%) and of new business (over 75%)

BCR Pensii, Societate de Administrare a Fondurilor de Pensii Private S.A. was established in June 2007, with an initial share capital of RON 50,000,000.

BCR PENSII Societate de Administrare a Fondurilor de Pensii Private S.A. was established in June 2007, with an initial share capital of RON 50,000,000.

BCR PENSII has been highly dynamic on the Romanian private pension market, helping the company consolidate its position on the market. In 2009, BCR PENSII finalized the take over of Omniforte – Privately Managed Pension Fund operating on the mandatory pension market and also entered the optional pension market by taking over BCR PRUDENT, the Optional Pension Fund and finalized the take over of mandatory pension funds Prima Pensie and OTP at the beginning of 2010.

BCR owns 99.99% of the shares of BCR Pensii, Societate de Administrare a Fondurilor de Pensii Private S.A.

BCR Leasing S.A. was created in March 2001, to complement the financing offer of Banca Comercială Română Group dedicated to individuals, legal entities and authorized natural persons, for purchasing durable goods.

BCR LEASING IFN S.A. provides internal financial leasing services for purchasing durable goods, namely: leasing for purchasing motor vehicles, fleets, industrial equipment and machines, medical equipment, software and IT equipment etc., as well as leasing for industrial or commercial buildings.

89.03% of BCR Leasing is controlled by BCR, while Financiara SA holds 10% of the capital and the remaining 0.97% is owned by individuals.

good.bee Service ROcompany offering good.bee Mobile Transaction service, was established through a partnership between Erste Foundation and Erste Group.

Strategy
The BCR strategy takes into consideration the current economic environment and the potential trends of the Romanian finance-banking market and decides that BCR must distinguish itself in a competitive environment by embracing an approach focused on the client’s needs.

Business lines
BCR offers a wide range of banking services for retail clients: current account, saving products, secured and unsecured loans, internet and phone banking, “Primeste pensia în cont curent” (“Receive your pension in the current account”), direct debit, standing order, money transfer payments, traveler’s cheques, SEIF BCR – lockboxes and sealed bags, transfers of amounts in hard currency.

For corporate clients, BCR offers financing for the investments of local public authorities in the social and utilities infrastructure (large and small cities), co-financing for the implementation of international funding programs: PHARE/SAPARD/EBRD/EU, investment loans and financing of the working capital for SMEs, financing of trade, factoring, cash management for large companies, e-payment solutions (local taxes and fees, banking transfer, multi-cash).

Management
The highest governance body in BCR is the Supervisory Board, whose President does not hold an executive position within BCR.

The BCR management is structured on two levels: the executive management – Senior Management, made of five executive members and the supervisory level – Supervisory Board, made of seven members, fully non-executives (namely uninvolved in adopting current – executive – decisions of the company).

The Senior Management reports to the Supervisory Board and regularly informs the board on the decisions made on duty. The Supervisory Board approves the bank strategy, including the social responsibility strategy, upon proposal of the Senior Management.

Supervisory Board

 Andreas Treichl, CEO
 Franz Hochstrasser, Deputy CEO
 Manfred Wimmer, CFO / CPO
 Gernot Mittendorfer, CRO
 Herbert Juranek, COO

Social responsibility
For almost 16 years, Banca Comercială Română has been contributing annually with approximately EUR 2 million to the community’s sustainable development, by supporting projects that were in line with the national priorities and the bank’s vision.

 Personal finance is a financial education program for high-school students developed by BCR together with Junior Achievement Romania over a 3-year period.
 Start!Business is a project aimed at developing entrepreneurship among students, implemented with the support of BCR employees.
 BCR Hopes aims at supporting the musical education of some talented children and young people who face financial hardship.

Sponsorships
 BCR is title sponsor of the most popular sports event hosted in Romania, the international BCR OPEN tennis tournament. The BCR OPEN tournament has a 15-year-old history in the ATP World Tour 250 series circuit and has become the leading tennis tournament in South-Eastern Europe over time, with important prizes in money and the possibility of collecting ATP points.
 In 2010, BCR became the Official Partner of the Romanian Tennis Federation (FRT). Under this cooperation, the two partners launched the BCR FUTURES ROMANIA circuit: a series of 17 tournaments (9 for men and 8 for women), each of them offering prizes worth USD 10,000. The tournaments take place in Bucharest, Pitesti, Bacau, Brasov, Medias, Cluj, Iasi, Craiova, Arad, Onesti, Bals.
 Over its 20 years of activity, BCR sponsored the Awards Gala of the Writers’ Union of Romania, the Awards Gala of the Association of Television Professionals, the International Theater Festival from Sibiu, the Shakespeare Festival from Craiova, the Medieval Festival from Sighisoara, the International Jazz Festival from Sibiu, the Enescu Festival and the research work of musicologist Viorel Cosma – the Romanian Music Encyclopedia.

References

Banks of Romania
Romanian brands